The IAI Westwind is a business jet initially produced by Aero Commander as the 1121 Jet Commander.

Powered by twin  GE CJ610 turbojets, it first flew on January 27, 1963, and received its type certification on November 4, 1964, before the first delivery.
The program was bought by Israel Aircraft Industries (IAI) in 1968, which stretched it slightly into the 1123 Westwind, and then re-engined it with Garrett TFE731 turbofans into the 1124 Westwind.

The  MTOW aircraft can carry up to 8 or 10 passengers, and 442 were produced until 1987.

Development

Aero Commander 
The Westwind was originally designed in the United States by Aero Commander as a development of its twin-propeller namesake aircraft, first flying on January 27, 1963, as the Aero Commander 1121 Jet Commander.
After successful testing, the aircraft was put into series production with deliveries to customers beginning in early 1965.

After initial testing of the prototype, it was modified to production standard with an addition of 2.5 ft to the fuselage length and increased payload and maximum weights. The second prototype first flew on April 14, 1964, which was followed by the first production aircraft in November 1964. Type approval was awarded by the FAA in November, enabling the first customer delivery on January 11, 1965.

Shortly thereafter, Aero Commander was acquired by North American Rockwell. The Jet Commander created a problem, since Rockwell already had an executive jet of its own design, the Sabreliner, and could not keep both in production because of antitrust laws. Therefore, the company decided to sell off the rights to the Jet Commander, which were purchased by IAI in 1968.

Israel Aircraft Industries 
Jet Commander production amounted to 150 aircraft in the United States and Israel before IAI undertook a series of modifications to create the 1123 Westwind. These included stretching the fuselage and increasing maximum takeoff, maximum landing, and maximum zero-fuel weights, with the wing modified to incorporate double-slotted flaps and drooped leading edges and tip tanks. The trimmable horizontal stabiliser was also modified to have increased span and more travel. Not long after the aircraft went into production, the original General Electric CJ610 turbojet engines were replaced by more fuel-efficient Garrett TFE731 turbofans Numerous airframe modifications also were made, such as drooped leading edges on the wings, a dorsal fin, revised engine pylons and nacelles, and further increases in maximum takeoff, maximum landing, and maximum zero-fuel weights. With improvements to a number of onboard systems incorporated, as well, these changes resulted in the 1124 Westwind delivered from 1976.

In 1976, in the wake of the terrorist takeover of the Savoy hotel in Tel Aviv, the Israeli Air Force decided to use the Westwind as the basis for a maritime patrol aircraft, which became known as the IAI Sea Scan. It had originally been developed to meet a requirement for the United States Coast Guard to replace the Grumman HU-16 Albatross, but they selected the Dassault Falcon instead.

In 1980, deliveries of the Model 1124A commenced; modifications included a new wing centre-section and the addition of winglets to the tips. The revamped aircraft was called the Westwind II, replacing the original design in production. IAI built its last Westwind in 1987, after a total of 442 Jet Commanders and Westwinds had been built, switching production to the Astra.

By 2018, 1980s Westwind 1124s were priced from $300,000 to $700,000.

Design
The Jet Commander/Westwind was of broadly conventional business jet arrangement, with two engines mounted in nacelles carried on the rear fuselage, but the wings were mounted halfway up the fuselage instead of the typical low-wing arrangement of aircraft in this class.

Variants

The 1122 Type Certificate was cancelled, the two airplanes manufactured have been converted to model 1123.
The 1124N Sea Scan is a maritime surveillance aircraft, and the 1124 was renamed Westwind I after the introduction of the 1124A Westwind II.
The 1121C is an unofficial designation for 1121 aircraft modified under a Supplemental Type Certificate with an increased all-up weight available from 1971.

Operators

Civil operators

Military operators

Accidents and incidents

The Rockwell 1121 had 21 hull-loss accidents causing 45 fatalities, and the IAI 1124 had 25 hull-loss accidents causing 47 fatalities.
The latest, on March 29, 2020, an air ambulance operated by Lionair, caught fire and exploded during take off at Manila Airport, killing all five passengers and three crew.

Specifications (1124A Westwind II)

See also

 Aero Commander 500
 British Aerospace 125 
 Hamburger Flugzeugbau HFB 320 Hansa Jet 
 Piaggio PD.808 
 Learjet 35/36 
 Cessna Citation III

References

External links

 
 

Aero Commander aircraft
IAI aircraft
Israeli business aircraft
1960s United States business aircraft
Twinjets
Mid-wing aircraft
Aircraft first flown in 1963